Redhill is a small community forming part of the much larger town of Arnold in Nottinghamshire, England.
The area is home to approximately 2,000 people, many of whom are commuters. The population is shown in the Gedling ward of Bonington.

Facilities

Although there is no commercial centre to Redhill, there is Redhill Academy, a specialist performing arts school, Redhill Leisure Centre and Redhill Stores and a newsagent. There are also two pubs: ‘The Ram Inn’ and ‘The Waggon And Horses’.
Redhill also hosts the nearest municipal cemetery for the residents of the Greater Arnold area.
Redhill also boasts a unisex hairdressing salon, two car servicing garages and a used car dealership.

Bus services

Nottingham City Transport
87: Nottingham - Sherwood- City Hospital - Edwards Lane - Redhill - Arnold

Stagecoach
Pronto: Chesterfield - Mansfield - Nottingham
 Sherwood Arrow: Worksop Retford Ollerton Nottingham

History

It is generally accepted by historians that Redhill takes its name from the clay-like red soil making up the hill at the centre of the community.
Running through Redhill is the primary road leading north out of Nottingham, now named Mansfield Road, which is part of the A60.
Prior to  it was considered to be the southern limit of Sherwood Forest.
A professional guide to lead travellers safely through the forest to Mansfield could be hired from the now-demolished ‘Guide House’, which stood on the eastern side of Mansfield Road to the north of Roscoe Avenue.

References

External links
The Redhill Academy

Villages in Nottinghamshire
Gedling